China men's national goalball team is the men's national team of China.  Goalball is a team sport designed specifically for athletes with vision impairment.  It takes part in international competitions.

Paralympic Games

2008 Beijing 

As the host nation, the team competed in the 2008 Summer Paralympics, from 6 to 17 September 2008, in the Beijing Institute of Technology Gymnasium 'bat wing' arena, Beijing, China.  There were 12 men's teams and 8 women's teams taking part in this event.  The team took gold.

2012 London 

The team competed in the 2012 Summer Paralympics from 30 August to 7 September 2012, in the Copper Box Arena, London, England.  They came sixth.

Quarter-finals

2016 Rio de Janeiro 

The team competed in the 2016 Summer Paralympics, with competition from Thursday, 8 September, to finals on Friday, 16 September 2016, in the temporary Future Arena, Rio de Janeiro, Brazil.  They came seventh.

Quarter-finals

2020 Tokyo 

The team competed in the 2020 Summer Paralympics, with competition from Wednesday, 25 August, to finals on Friday, 3 September 2021, in the Makuhari Messe arena, Chiba, Tokyo, Japan.  The team was selected for Tokyo 2020 following the 2019 IBSA Asia Regional Championships.

Round-robin

World Championships

2006 Spartanburg  

The team competed in the 2006 World Championships, in July 2006, in Spartanburg, South Carolina, United States of America.

2010 Sheffield 

The team competed in the 2010 World Championships, from 20 to 25 June 2010, in Sheffield, England, in Pool A.

2014 Espoo  

The team competed in the 2014 World Championships from 30 June to 5 July 2014, in Espoo, Finland.  In Pool B, they made the quarter-finals, but were defeated by Finland 2:5.

2018 Malmö 

The team competed in the 2018 World Championships from 3 to 8 June 2018, in Baltiska Hallen, Malmö, Sweden.  They placed third in Pool A, but lost to Germany 0:8 in the quarter-finals, to place seventh in the final standings.

2022 Matosinhos 

The team competed in the 2022 World Championships from 7 to 16 December 2022, at the Centro de Desportos e Congressos de Matosinhos, Portugal.  There were sixteen men's and sixteen women's teams.  They placed first in Pool D, winning all seven games, and second overall to Brazil in the final standings.

China, together with Brazil, secured berths for the 2024 Summer Paralympics, Paris, France.

IBSA World Games

2015 Seoul  

The team competed in the 2015 IBSA World Games from 10 to 17 May 2015, in Seoul, South Korea.  They were beaten by Lithuania, 3:10 in the gold medal match, to take silver.

Regional championships 

The team competed in  IBSA Asia goalball region, and from January 2010 became part of the IBSA Asia-Pacific goalball competition region.

2013 Beijing  

The team competed in the 2013 IBSA Asia Pacific Goalball Regional Championships, from 11 to 16 November 2013, in Beijing, China.  Of the six men's teams (Australia, China, Iran, Japan, Mongolia, Thailand), China beat Australia 10:1, to take the bronze medal.

2015 Hangzhou  

The team competed in the 2015 IBSA Asia Pacific Goalball Regional Championships, from 8 to 12 November 2015, in the China National Goalball Training Centre, Hangzhou, China.  Of the five men's teams (Australia, China, Iran, Japan, Korea), the team took the gold medal.

2017 Bangkok  

The team competed in the 2017 IBSA Asia/Pacific Goalball Regional Championships, from Monday 21 to Saturday 26 August 2017, in the  Thai-Japan Sports Stadium, Din Daeng, Bangkok, Thailand.  Competing in Pool A, they came third, going onto mercy South Korea 11:1 in the quarter-finals, beating Australia 7:3 in the semi-finals, and finally beating Iran 10:2, to take the gold medal.

2019 Chiba  

The team competed in the 2019 IBSA Goalball Asia-Pacific Regional Championships, from Thursday 5 to Tuesday 10 December 2019, in the Chiba Port Arena, Chiba, Japan. They placed first in Pool A in the round-robin, and took the gold medal.

See also 

 Disabled sports
 China women's national goalball team
 China at the Paralympics

References 

Goalball men's
National men's goalball teams
China at the Paralympics
Goalball in China
Goalball in Asia